Following is a list of current and former courthouses of the United States federal court system located in Maryland. Each entry indicates the name of the building along with an image, if available, its location and the jurisdiction it covers, the dates during which it was used for each such jurisdiction, and, if applicable the person for whom it was named, and the date of renaming. Dates of use will not necessarily correspond with the dates of construction or demolition of a building, as pre-existing structures may be adapted or court use, and former court buildings may later be put to other uses. Also, the official name of the building may be changed at some point after its use as a federal court building has been initiated.

The district court met in the Maryland State House, in Annapolis, for the first decade of its existence. In 1800, judge Samuel Chase tried a local postmaster for embezzlement and sentenced him to thirty-nine lashes. In order to carry out the sentence, the defendant was tied to one of the statehouse columns.

Courthouses

Key

References

External links

U.S. Marshals Service District of Maryland Courthouse Locations

Maryland
 Federal courthouses
Courthouses, federal